Maja Ring Kildemoes (born 15 August 1996) is a Danish football defender who plays for Danish club Brøndby IF and the Denmark women's national football team. She previously played for Elitedivisionen club Odense and Linköpings FC in Damallsvenskan.

Club career
Kildemoes played for Næsby BK's youth teams alongside boys until under-15 level, then joined Odense of the Elitedivisionen. In November 2016 she signed a two-year contract with Swedish Damallsvenskan champions Linköpings FC.

International career
Kildemoes made her debut for the senior Denmark women's national football team in September 2015, a 2–0 win over Romania in Mogoșoaia. She entered play as a substitute for Janni Arnth Jensen on 69 minutes and scored Denmark's first goal two minutes later.

International goals
Scores and results list Denmark's goal tally first.

Honour

Club 

Winner
 Damallsvenskan: 2017

References

External links 
 
 Danish national team profile 

1996 births
Living people
Danish women's footballers
Denmark women's international footballers
Odense Q players
Women's association football defenders
Danish expatriate women's footballers
Danish expatriate sportspeople in Sweden
Expatriate women's footballers in Sweden
Linköpings FC players
Damallsvenskan players
Footballers from Odense
UEFA Women's Euro 2017 players